Raphiptera is a genus of moths of the family Crambidae. It contains only one species, Raphiptera argillaceellus, the diminutive grass-veneer, which is found in eastern North America, where it has been recorded from Labrador, Ontario, Wisconsin, Connecticut, New York, Quebec, Alberta and Michigan. The range extends to Florida and Texas in the south-east and Costa Rica in Central America. The habitat consists of bogs.

The wingspan is 10–15 mm. The forewings are mouse grey with a silvery white median stripe and a white chevron and a triangular patch at the wing tip. The hindwings are light grey. Adults are on wing from June to August.

The larvae probably feed on grasses.

Subspecies
Raphiptera argillaceellus argillaceellus
Raphiptera argillaceellus minimellus (Robinson, 1870)

References

Natural History Museum Lepidoptera genus database

Crambini
Taxa named by George Hampson
Monotypic moth genera
Moths of North America